The 17th Central American and Caribbean Junior Championships were held in the Hasely Crawford Stadium in Port of Spain, Trinidad, between 14–16 July 2006, and organized by the National Amateur Athletic Association of Trinidad & Tobago (NAAATT).  The event was open for athletes from the invited countries, that are members of the Central American and Caribbean Athletic Confederation (CACAC), in two categories:  Junior A Category: 17 to 19 years as of 31 December 2004 (Born between 1987 and 1989), and Junior B Category: 14 to 16 years as of 31 December 2006 (Born between 1990 and 1992).  A preview and detailed discussions of the results on a day-by-day basis are given.

Records

A total of 18 new championship records were set.
 

Key

Notes:

1): This was a new championship record using the
(junior implement) hammer of 6 kg.  
However, Yosmel Montes from Cuba threw the hammer 65.88m using the (senior implement) 7.257 kg hammer during
the 1996 championships.

Medal summary
The results are published.

Male Junior A (under 20)

Female Junior A (under 20)

Male Junior B (under 17)

Female Junior B (under 17)

Medal table
The medal count was published.

Total

Sub 20

Sub 17

Remarks
1): Jamaica: count of bronze medals for sub-17 is 6 (rather than 7 as published), total is 28 (rather than 29 as published).

2): Mexico: count of bronze medals for sub-17 is 5 (rather than 6 as published), total is 16 (rather than 17 as published).  Total count of gold medals is 13 (rather than 14 as published), total is 41 (rather than 42 as published).

3): Bahamas: Total count of bronze medals is 11 (rather than 13 as published).

4): Puerto Rico: Total count of gold medals is 8 considering U-17 hammer throw.

Team trophies
Team trophies were distributed to the 1st place of the women category, to the 1st place of the men category, and to the 1st place overall (men and women categories).  However, points were only published for the overall (men and women combined) Sub-20 and Sub-17 categories.  Working through the results yields the following unofficial ranking.

Overall

Male

Female

Remarks
The published points and corresponding ranks for the Sub-20 category contain 3rd place ties for Jamaica and Mexico, 4th place ties for Barbados and Bermuda, and 5th place ties for Trinidad & Tobago and St. Lucia.  However, there is no evidence in the published results.  Rather, corresponding ties are evident in the Sub-17 category, where they are already taken into account.  Correcting the published Sub-20 point scheme correspondingly, it can be verified that the calculated points from the above tables are completely in line with the published point tables.

Participation
Detailed result lists can be found on the CACAC, on the CFPI and on the World Junior Athletics History
website. An unofficial count yields the number of about 440 athletes from about
24 countries:

 (7)
 (5)
 (55)
 (34)
 (10)
 (11)
 (7)
 (4)
 (6)
 (6)
 (3)
 (4)
 (8)
 (6)
 (68)
 México (61)
 (6)
 (50)
 (20)
 (3)
 (13)
 (53)
 (7)
 (2)

References

External links
Official CACAC Website
CACAC Championships Website
Local Championships Website

Central American and Caribbean Junior Championships in Athletics
2006 in Trinidad and Tobago sport
Central American and Caribbean Junior Championships
International athletics competitions hosted by Trinidad and Tobago
2006 in Caribbean sport
2006 in youth sport